The 2010–11 Illinois Fighting Illini men's basketball team represented the University of Illinois at Urbana–Champaign in the 2010–11 NCAA Division I men's basketball season.  This was head coach Bruce Weber's eighth season at Illinois. They played their home games at Assembly Hall and are members of the Big Ten Conference. They finished the season 20–14, 9–9 in Big Ten play and lost in the quarterfinals of the 2011 Big Ten Conference men's basketball tournament to Michigan. They received an at-large bid in the 2011 NCAA Division I men's basketball tournament where they beat UNLV in the second round before falling to Kansas in the third round.

Pre-season 
Illinois welcomes back all five starters and its top seven players from last season. The Illini return 89.4 percent of its points, 79 percent of its rebounds, and 85 percent of its minutes played from the 2009–10 campaign.  In addition to the returning players, Illinois adds a top-15 ranked recruiting class to its roster. Three true freshmen join the squad this season in guard/forward Jereme Richmond, center Meyers Leonard, and guard Crandall Head. The 2010 recruiting class is ranked No. 11 by Scout.com and No. 13 by both Rivals.com and ESPNU. Richmond earned Illinois Mr. Basketball honors and was selected to play in the 2010 McDonald’s All-American Game, becoming Illinois’ 13th McDonald’s All-American and first since Dee Brown. A top-25 recruit, Richmond averaged 21 points, 11.5 rebounds, three assists and three blocks as a senior. Leonard was a consensus first-team all-state selection who led Robinson High School to the 2010 Illinois state title in Class 2A. A top-50 recruit, Leonard averaged 19 points, 11 rebounds and 4.5 blocks as a senior. Head is the younger brother of former Illini All-American Luther Head. Crandall missed his senior season after having surgery to repair a torn ACL. He is a top-75 recruit who earned all-state honors as a junior, averaging 21 points, seven rebounds and four steals.

Departures

2010 additions

Roster

Schedule 
Source

|-
!colspan=12 style="background:#DF4E38; color:white;"| Exhibition

|-
!colspan=12 style="background:#DF4E38; color:white;"| Non-Conference regular season

|-
!colspan=9 style="background:#DF4E38; color:#FFFFFF;"|Big Ten regular season

|-
!colspan=9 style="text-align: center; background:#DF4E38"|Big Ten tournament

|-
!colspan=9 style="text-align: center; background:#DF4E38"|NCAA tournament

National rankings 

Various publications and news sources released their preseason rankings prior to the start of the 2010–11 season. Illinois has been ranked by the publications below.  The Fighting Illini were ranked 13th in the AP Poll and 16th in the Coaches Poll in their respective pre-season polls.

Season statistics 

Individual Player Statistics

  MINUTES   |--TOTAL--| |--3-PTS--| |-F-THROWS-| |---REBOUNDS---|                    |-SCORING-|
## Player           GP GS Tot  Avg   FG FGA Pct  3FG FGA Pct  FT FTA  Pct Off Def Tot Avg PF FO  A  TO Blk Stl Pts   Avg
32 McCamey, Demetri 31 29 1026 33.1  153 335 .457 68 147 .463 91 124 .734  16  90 106 3.4 62  0 189 89   6 31  465  15.0
24 Davis, Mike      31 31 1009 32.5  158 295 .536  0   1 .000 61  90 .678  50 170 220 7.1 73  1 51  41  26 28  377  12.2
54 Tisdale, Mike    31 29 792  25.5  119 230 .517 18  42 .429 56  70 .800  70 129 199 6.4 111 5 36  52  50 15  312  10.1
03 Paul, Brandon    31  8 673  21.7   90 225 .400 38 108 .352 66  84 .786  18  71  89 2.9 53  0 61  55  10 29  284   9.2
01 Richardson, D.J. 31 29 853  27.5   91 224 .406 50 130 .385 25  33 .758  11  46  57 1.8 63  1 60  36   5 20  257   8.3
22 Richmond, Jereme 30  6 669  22.3  101 193 .523  2  11 .182 26  43 .605  53 101 154 5.1 50  1 57  51  13 13  230   7.7
30 Cole, Bill       31 21 627  20.2   53 117 .453 29  80 .363 17  21 .810  29  51  80 2.6 53  0 40  12  16 19  152   4.9
12 Leonard, Meyers  30  1 260   8.7   27  57 .474  0   1 .000 10  15 .667  10  31  41 1.4 46  0  5  24  12  5   64   2.1
42 Griffey, Tyler   24  0 166   6.9   14  42 .333  4  11 .364 10  15 .667  11  18  29 1.2 20  0  1  12   3  5   42   1.8
02 Bertrand, Joseph 13  0  49   3.8    7  13 .538  0   1 .000  3   4 .750   1   5   6 0.5  6  0  3   3   2  1   17   1.3
04 Head, Crandall   15  1  83   5.5    7  18 .389  1   7 .143  4   6 .667   1   2   3 0.2  8  0 10  11   0  3   19   1.3
21 Berardini, Kevin  8  0  14   1.8    1   1 1.000 0   0 .000  4   6 .667   1   2   4 0.4  2  0  1   2   0  1    6   0.8
15 Selus, Jean       5  0   5   1.0    0   1 .000  0   1 .000  1   2 .500   0   0   0 0.0  1  0  1   0   0  1    1   0.2
   Team                                                                   47  49  96      1     7
   Total..........  31    6226   821 1751 .469 210 540 .389 374 513 .729 318 765 1083 34.9 549 8 515 395 143 171 2226 71.8
   Opponents......  31    6227   712 1777 .401 183 612 .299 420 582 .722 361 670 1031 33.3 509 5 375 382  91 171 2027 65.4

Regular season

Post-season

References 

Illinois
Illinois Fighting Illini men's basketball seasons
Illinois
Illinois
Illinois